Noel! Noel!! Noel!!! is a holiday album by Michel Legrand featuring various artists, released in December 2011 through Verve Records.

Track listing
 Jamie Cullum – "Let It Snow"
 Teddy Thompson/Rufus Wainwright – "White Christmas"
 Madeleine Peyroux – "Have Yourself a Merry Little Christmas"
 Madeleine Peyroux, Emilie Simon, Carla Bruni, Rufus Wainwright, Iggy Pop – "Noel d'Espoir"
 MIKA – "Vive le Vent" (Jingle Bells)
 Emilie Simon – "Santa Baby"
 Carla Bruni – "Jolis Sapins"
 Iggy Pop – "The Little Drummer Boy"
 Ayo – "Santa Claus Is Coming to Town"
 Imelda May – "Silent Night"

Alternative track listing (French version)
 Jamie Cullum – "Let It Snow"
 Rufus Wainwright, Madeleine Peyroux, Emilie Simon, Carla Bruni, Iggy Pop – "Noel d'Espoir"
 Madeleine Peyroux – "Have Yourself a Merry Little Christmas"
 MIKA – "Vive le Vent" (Jingle Bells)
 Emilie Simon – "Santa Baby"
 Renan Luce - "Le pere Noel et la petite fille"
 Coeur de Pirate - "Noel Blanc"  (White Christmas)
 Carla Bruni – "Jolis Sapins"
 Iggy Pop – "The Little Drummer Boy"
 Ayo – "Santa Claus Is Coming to Town"
 Olivia Ruiz - "Le Noel de la rue"
 -M- - "Douce Nuit" (Silent Night)

References

2011 albums
Verve Records albums